Jefery Levy (born May 21, 1958) is an American film and television director, producer, and writer, based in Beverly Hills, California.

Career
In 1985, while a graduate student at UCLA, Levy wrote and produced the low-budget hit Ghoulies, a horror-comedy film. He has produced and directed dozens of TV and film projects over a span of three decades, and he is most recently known for the 2015 film ME, which he directed, produced, wrote, and starred.

Levy's debut feature was Drive, starring Academy Award nominee David Warner, and it won the FIPRESCI Award at the 1991 Venice International Film Festival.

The Key
Levy's 2014 film adaption of the novel The Key by the Japanese writer Junichiro Tanizaki premiered at the Real Experiment Film Festival at the Laemmle Music Hall Theater in Beverly Hills. The Key explores the twisted sexual life and marriage of a Los Angeles couple through their private journals in an explicit cinematic portrayal.

Teaching appointments
From 1991 to 1996, Levy served as the youngest associate professor at USC School of Cinema/Television. Levy was also a faculty member of The American Film Institute, where he taught the master directing class from 1995 to 1996).

Selected filmography
Ghoulies (1985)
Rockula (1990)
Drive (1991)
Inside Monkey Zetterland (1993)
S.F.W. (1994)
Sliders (1997, TV)
Lawless (1997) (TV)
Roar (1998, TV)
Spy Game (1998, TV)
Hollyweird (1998, TV pilot)
Invincible (1999, TV pilot)
Et Tu Babe (1999)
Iggy Vile M.D. (1999) (TV)
Profiler (1999, TV)
Get Real (1999, TV)
Secret Agent Man (1999, TV pilot)
The Expendables (2000, TV pilot)
Freakylinks (2000, TV pilot)
Dark Angel (2000, TV)
Harsh Realm (2000, TV)
Roswell (2001)
UC: Undercover (2001, TV)
CSI: Crime Scene Investigation (2001, TV)
Night Visions (2001, TV)
Keen Eddie (2003, TV)
Queens Supreme (2003, TV)
The Dead Zone (2003, TV)
Numb3rs (2005, TV)
Rescue Me (2005, TV)
Monk (2006, TV)
Eureka (2006, TV pilot)
Las Vegas (2006, TV)
Ghost Whisperer (2005, TV)
The Key (2014)
ME (2015)

References

External links

Official Website

Living people
American television directors
American film directors
University of Southern California faculty
University of California, Los Angeles alumni
UCLA Film School alumni
1958 births